The Pfizer Award in Enzyme Chemistry, formerly known as the Paul-Lewis Award in Enzyme Chemistry  was established in 1945. Consisting of a gold medal and honorarium, its purpose is to stimulate fundamental research in enzyme chemistry by scientists not over forty years of age. The award is administered by the Division of Biological Chemistry of the American Chemical Society and sponsored by Pfizer. The award was terminated in 2022.

Recipients
Source: 

1946 – David E. Green
1947 – Van R. Potter
1948 – Albert L. Lehninger
1949 – Henry A. Lardy
1950 – Britton Chance
1951 – Arthur Kornberg
1952 – Bernard L. Horecker
1953 – Earl R. Stadtman
1954 – Alton Meister
1955 – Paul D. Boyer
1956 – Merton F. Utter
1957 – G. Robert Greenberg
1958 – Eugene P. Kennedy
1959 – Minor J. Coon
1960 – Arthur Pardee
1961 – Frank M. Huennekens
1962 – Jack L. Strominger
1963 – Charles Gilvarg
1964 – Marshall Nirenberg
1965 – Frederic M. Richards
1966 – Samuel B. Weiss
1967 – P. Roy Vagelos & Salih J. Wakil
1968 – William J. Rutter
1969 – Robert T. Schimke
1970 – Herbert Weissbach
1971 – Jack Preiss
1972 – Ekkehard K. F. Bautz
1973 – Howard M. Temin
1974 – Michael J. Chamberlin
1975 – Malcolm L. Gefter
1976 – Michael S. Brown & Joseph L. Goldstein
1977 – Stephen J. Benkovic
1978 – Paul Schimmel
1979 – Frederik C. Hartman
1980 – Thomas A. Steitz
1981 – Daniel V. Santi
1982 – Richard R. Burgess
1983 – Paul L. Modrich
1984 – Robert T.N. Tjian
1985 – Thomas R. Cech
1986 – JoAnne Stubbe
1987 – Gregory Petsko
1988 – John W. Kozarich
1989 – Kenneth A. Johnson
1990 – James A. Wells
1991 – Ronald Vale
1992 – Carl O. Pabo
1993 – Michael H. Gelb
1994 – Donald Hilvert
1995 – Gerald F. Joyce
1996 – P. Andrew Karplus
1997 – Daniel Herschlag
1998 – Ronald T. Raines
1999 – David W. Christianson
2000 – Eric T. Kool
2001 – Ruma Banerjee
2002 – Karin Musier-Forsyth
2003 – Dorothee Kern
2004 – Wilfred A. van der Donk
2005 – Nicole S. Sampson
2006 – James Berger
2007 – Neil L. Kelleher
2008 – Carsten Krebs
2009 – Virginia Cornish
2010 – Vahe Bandarian
2011 – Sarah O’Connor
2012 – Jin Zhang
2013 – Kate Carroll
2014 – Hening Lin
2015 – Douglas Mitchell
2016 – Michelle C. Chang
2017 – Emily Balskus
2018 – Mohammad Seyedsayamdost
2019 – Kenichi Yokoyama
2020 – Rahul Kohli
2021 – Amie K. Boal

See also

 List of biochemistry awards

References

External links 
 Division of Biological Chemistry, American Chemical Society

Biochemistry awards